Jesica Fitriana Martasari Alfharisi (born March 31, 1995) is an Indonesian Ministry of Tourism Ambassador, HIV/AIDS activist, Furniture designer, TV commercial model and a beauty pageant titleholder who won the title of Puteri Indonesia Pariwisata 2019. She represented Indonesia at the Miss Supranational 2019 pageant, where she placed as the "2nd Runner-Up", the highest placement of Indonesia at the Miss Supranational pageant, became the sixth Indonesian to be placed as a finalist in Miss Supranational history, continuing the ongoing fifth year placement streaks of Indonesia, consecutively since Gresya Amanda Maaliwuga in 2015, Intan Aletrinö in 2016, Karina Nadila Niab in 2017 and Wilda Octaviana Situngkir in 2018.

Early life and education
Jesica was born in Bogor, West Java, Indonesia, to a Pakistani-Dutch-born Indonesian father, Malik Alfharisi from Karachi, and an Indonesian mother, Neneng Nurbaiti Martasari from Sundanese ethnic. She has one younger brother named Alris Alfharisi. She has been working as a model since the age of 15, and her hobby includes dancing and boxing. She has also been working as the Ambassador for Ministry of Tourism of Indonesia since she was crowned as Puteri Indonesia Pariwisata 2019. She holds a bachelor degree in Business Management from Bandung Institute of Technology, Bandung, West Java, Indonesia. After graduated she run her own furniture design studio, together with her family.

Jesica is an aspirator and activist for an organization that saves and protect toddler and children survivors of HIV/AIDS caused by HIV in Pregnancy issues. To overcome this, in 2016 she collaborated with the local organization to arrange her own NGO, called "ADHA House" in Bogor, which has been active and focusing on "ADHA" (children who fight against HIV/AIDS from their own parents) by giving them access to get free Antiviral therapy, Antiviral therapy, anti-HIV therapy (HAART), proper nutrition for managing this condition and Mental Health for toddler and children.

Pageantry

Puteri West Java 2018-2019
Jesica competed in the regional pageant of Puteri West Java Pageant two times in 2018 and 2019, before winning the title to represent her province West Java in Puteri Indonesia 2019.

Puteri Indonesia 2019
Jesica represented the West Java province at the pageant, where Jesica was crowned as Puteri Indonesia Pariwisata 2019 at the grand finale held in Jakarta Convention Center on March 8, 2019 (International Women's Day) by the outgoing titleholder of Puteri Indonesia Pariwisata 2018 and the 3rd Runner-up Miss Supranational 2018, Wilda Octaviana Situngkir of West Kalimantan. She was also nominated for the "Best in Talent" award.

At her national competition, during her finale night speech for Puteri Indonesia 2019, Jesica successfully raised the awareness about gender equality topic;

The finale coronation night of Puteri Indonesia 2019 was attended by the reigning Miss Supranational 2018 - Valeria Vázquez of Puerto Rico as a main Guest-star and Miss Supranational 2017 - Jenny Kim of Korea as part of the selection committee. Jesica was crowned together with Frederika Alexis Cull as Puteri Indonesia 2019 and Jolene Marie Cholock-Rotinsulu as Puteri Indonesia Lingkungan 2019.

Miss Supranational 2019
As Puteri Indonesia Pariwisata 2019, Jesica represented Indonesia at the 11th edition of Miss Supranational 2019 pageant in Katowice International Congress Centre, Katowice, Silesian - Poland, the finale coronation night was held on 6 December 2019. Jesica competed with the other 77 countries, where she ended-up crowned as the "2nd runner-up" of Miss Supranational 2019. She is also won several awards; "Supra Fan Vote Winner", "Women of Substance", and "2nd Runner-up Best National Costume". Valeria Vázquez of Puerto Rico crowned her successor Anntonia Porsild of Thailand by the end of the event.

See also

 Puteri Indonesia 2019
 Miss Supranational 2019
 Frederika Alexis Cull
 Jolene Marie Cholock-Rotinsulu

References

External links

 
 

Living people
1995 births
Puteri Indonesia winners
Miss Supranational contestants
HIV/AIDS activists
Mental health activists
Child activists
Children's rights activists
Bandung Institute of Technology alumni
Indonesian beauty pageant winners
Indonesian female models
Sundanese people
Indo people
People from Bogor
Pakistani expatriates in Indonesia
Indonesian people of Pakistani descent
Indonesian people of Middle Eastern descent
Indonesian people of Dutch descent